University of NorthWest, established in 2001 in New York City (University of NorthWest, 45 Main Street, Ste 309, Brooklyn, NY 11201), is a provider of distance education that offers academic degrees in several fields. Additionally, its website states that it offers classes at 'learning centers' in Canada, China, Bangladesh, Ireland, India, Kenya, Lebanon, Malaysia, Nepal, Nigeria, Pakistan, Russia, Singapore, Sri Lanka, Taiwan, Thailand and the United Kingdom. In the summer of 2010, the Oregon Office of Degree Authorization reported that the University of NorthWest was actively engaged in Afghanistan.

Accreditation status
NorthWest's promotional materials state that it is incorporated in the United States, but that it is "not accredited by an accreditation agency approved by the US Department of Education" Allen Ezell's 2007 book Accreditation Mills discusses the institution as an example of a 'degree mill'. It is listed as an unaccredited institution by the education agencies in Oregon and Maine. In addition to being unaccredited, it is illegal to use its degrees in Texas.

In 2009, it was listed  as registered with the American Association of Collegiate Registrars and Admissions Officers.

References

External links
 

Unaccredited institutions of higher learning in the United States
Distance education institutions based in the United States
For-profit universities and colleges in the United States
Educational institutions established in 2001
2001 establishments in New York City